The Human Body is a British documentary film produced by Discovery Pictures and BBC Worldwide, and distributed by nWave Pictures Distribution. The film was adapted from the BBC/The Learning Channel documentary series of the same name. The film was released on October 14, 2001 for IMAX and Giant Screen cinemas. The film won the Giant Screen Theatre Association's Best Film For Lifelong Learning award.

Premise 
Three years in the making, The Human Body reveals the incredible story of life. In astonishing detail, this large format film presents a look at the biological processes that go on without our control and often without our notice. Throughout the film, we follow a family from dawn to dusk as they go about their daily routines. But this is no ordinary story. This is the tale of what takes place beneath the skin—a tale that allows us to see the accomplishments of our everyday lives.

Cast
Heather Pike
Buster Pike
Zannah Lawrence
Luke Brinkers
Wyatt Pike
Jay Simon

Release

Home media 
The Human Body was included as a bonus feature in the 2003 DVD release of Discovery Health's Ultimate Guide: The Human Body.

Notes

References

External links
 
 

2001 films
British documentary films
IMAX films
BBC Film films
2000s English-language films
2000s British films